The Glass House Mountains are a mountain range in Queensland, Australia. Glass House Mountains can also refer to:
Glass House Mountains National Park, containing the mountains
Glass House Mountains, Queensland, a town near the mountains
Glasshouse Mountains railway station, which serves the town and the national park